Nadsat is a fictional register or argot used by the teenage gang members in Anthony Burgess's dystopian novel A Clockwork Orange. Burgess was a linguist and he used this background to depict his characters as speaking a form of Russian-influenced English. The name comes from the Russian suffix equivalent of -teen as in thirteen. Nadsat was also used in Stanley Kubrick's film adaptation of the book.

Description 

Nadsat is a mode of speech used by the nadsat, members of the teen subculture in the novel A Clockwork Orange. The narrator and protagonist of the book, Alex, uses it in first-person style to relate the story to the reader. He also uses it to communicate with other characters in the novel, such as his droogs, parents, victims and any authority-figures with whom he comes in contact. As with many speakers of non-standard varieties of English, Alex is capable of speaking standard English when he wants to.  It is not a written language: the sense that readers get is of a transcription of vernacular speech.

Nadsat is English with some borrowed words from Russian. It also contains influences from Cockney rhyming slang, the King James Bible, German, some words of unclear origin and some that Burgess invented. The word nadsat is the suffix of Russian numerals from 11 to 19. Droog is derived from the Welsh word , meaning 'bad', 'naughty' or 'evil' and the Russian word , meaning a 'close friend'. The word like and the expression the old are often used as fillers or discourse markers.

The original 1991 translation of Burgess's book into Russian solved the problem of how to illustrate the Nadsat words by using transliterated, slang English words in places where Burgess had used Russian onesfor example, droogs became . Borrowed English words with Russian inflection were widely used in Russian slang, especially among Russian hippies in the 1970s–1980s.

Function 
Burgess, a polyglot who loved language in all its forms, was aware that linguistic slang was of a constantly changing nature. He knew that if he used contemporary modes of speech, the novel would very quickly become dated. His use of Nadsat was pragmatic; he needed his narrator to have a unique voice that would remain ageless, while reinforcing Alex's indifference to his society's norms, and to suggest that youth subculture was independent from the rest of society. In A Clockwork Orange, Alex's interrogators describe the source of his argot as "subliminal penetration".

Russian influences 
Russian influences play the biggest role in Nadsat. Most of those Russian-influenced words are slightly anglicized loan-words, often maintaining the original Russian pronunciation.

A further means of constructing Nadsat words is the employment of homophones (known as folk etymology). In this same manner many of the Russian loan-words become an English–Russian hybrid, with Russian origins, and English spellings and pronunciations. A further example is the Russian word for 'head', which sounds similar to Gulliver known from Gulliver’s Travels;  became the Nadsat expression for the concept 'head'.

Other influences 
Additional words were borrowed from other languages: A (possibly Saudi-owned) hotel was named 'Al Idayyin, an Arabic-sounding variant on “Holiday Inn” Hotel chain, while also alluding to the name Aladdin.

Word derivation by common techniques 
Nadsat's English slang is constructed with common language-formation techniques. Some words are blended, others clipped or compounded. Many common English slang terms are simply shortened.

Rhyming slang 
This feature of Nadsat is derived from Cockney.
  = 'chaplain' Chaplain and Chaplin (from Charlie Chaplin) are homophones.
  = 'money'  rhymes with bread and butter, a wilful alteration of bread and honey 'money'.
  = 'corny'
  = 'fun' Fun means 'gang violence' in the context of the story.

See also 
 Runglish
 Newspeak
 Verlan
 Polari
 List of nadsat words
 List of fictional languages

References

General bibliography 
 Aggeler, Geoffrey. "Pelagius and Augustine in the novels of Anthony Burgess". English Studies 55 (1974): 43–55. .
 Burgess, Anthony (1990). You've Had Your Time: Being the Second Part of the Confessions of Anthony Burgess. New York: Grove Weidenfeld. . .
 Gladsky, Rita K. "Schema Theory and Literary Texts: Anthony Burgess' Nadsat. Language Quarterly 30:1–2 (Winter–Spring 1992): 39–46.

External links

A Clockwork Orange
English-based argots
Future dialects
Russian slang
Constructed languages
Constructed languages introduced in 1962